Ashok Nete (born 1 July 1963) is member of the 16th Lok Sabha from Gadchiroli–Chimur (Lok Sabha constituency) in Maharashtra state of India associated with the Bharatiya Janata Party. He was member of Maharashtra Legislative Assembly twice: 1999–2004  and 2004–2009.

He contested 2009 Lok Sabha elections but lost to Marotrao Kowase of Indian National Congress who got 38.43% votes while Nete secured 35.025% votes. He also contested the 2014 LS elections from Gadchiroli-Chimur constituency as BJP/NDA candidate.

Personal life
Ashok Nete married Archana Warthe in 1998. They have two daughters Akshata and Ashita and a son Arnav.

Positions held

Within BJP

Taluka President, BJYM (1991–1994)
President, ST Morcha Gadchiroli District BJP (1994–1997)
Vice President, Gadchiroli District BJP (1997–1999)
State Secretary, ST Morcha BJP, Maharashtra (1999–2001)
State Secretary, BJP, Maharashtra (2001–2003)
National Member, SC Morcha BJP, All India(2006–2009)
State President, SC Morcha BJP Maharashtra (2009–2014)

Legislative

Member, Maharashtra Legislative Assembly – 2 terms, since 1999 & 2004.
Member 16th Lok Sabha in 2014, Gadchiroli–Chimur (Lok Sabha constituency)

References

People from Gadchiroli district
1968 births
Maharashtra MLAs 1999–2004
Maharashtra MLAs 2004–2009
Living people
India MPs 2014–2019
India MPs 2019–present
Lok Sabha members from Maharashtra
Bharatiya Janata Party politicians from Maharashtra